Spanish military units have coats of arms, badges and emblems to distinguish them from other units both joint Armed Forces and service branches units.

The first evidence of medieval coats of arms is found in the Bayeux Tapestry from the 11th century, where some of the combatants carry shields painted with crosses. Coats of arms came into general use by feudal lords and knights in battle in the 12th century. By the 13th century arms had spread beyond their initial battlefield use to become a kind of flag or logo for families in the higher social classes of Europe. The use of arms spread to Church clergy, and to towns as civic identifiers, and to royally-chartered organizations such as universities and trading companies. In the 21st century, coats of arms are still in use by a variety of institutions and individuals. Military coats of arms and emblems were first required in navies and air forces to recognize naval fleets and squadrons. Nowadays Spanish military insignia are used for official wear or display by military personnel and Armed Forces units and organizations, including branches, commands, cops, brigades, divisions, regiments, battalions, centres et cetera.

Vicente de Cadenas y Vicent (1915–2005), Chronicler King of Arms of Spain, said military objects and natural figures are the most common heraldic charges used in Spanish Armed Forces heraldry. Chimeric figures are also used but they are uncommon. Mister Cadenas y Vicent also noted there are too many wrongly located charges in Spanish military escutcheons.

Army 
The Army has a fairly high number of coat of arms used by units, centres and organisms, it is the largest and most consistent military coats of arms collection in Spain. Emblems and badges of Army corps, military occupational specialties and some centres are also relevant. After the Uniformity Report adopted in December 1989, coats of arms design and standardization criteria for Spanish Army units and organizations were adopted according to Army Circular 371/70001/87. The Institute of Military History and Culture (Instituto de Historia y Cultura Militar), an agency of the Army, provides studies of coats of arms and definitive proposals.

Coats of arms used in the Spanish Army have supporters called attributos (attributes) and displayed diagonally, the most important supporters are:
 Units, centres and organisms of Infantry: Two Mauser rifles Spanish model 1893, armed with bayonets.
 Units, centres and organisms of Cavalry: Two Spanish lances model 1861 with flags.
 Units, centres and organisms of Artillery:  Two 18th-century Spanish cannons.
 Units, centres and organisms of Military Engineers: One pick and one shovel.
 Units, centres and organisms of Signal Corps: Four Electrodes with rays.
 Units, centres and organisms of Logistics Corps: A Mauser rifle Spanish model 1893 armed with bayonet and one torch.
 Units, centres and organisms of  Army Airmobile Force: Two helicopter rotors.
 The Army Headquarters, its divisions, directions, and dependent units directly reporting to it (except the King's Immemorial Infantry Regiment): Two Spanish captain general's batons.
 Staffs at all levels (except the Army Headquarters): Two oak branches.
 The Logistic Support Command and dependent organisms: Two torches.
 The Land Force, Canarias Command, Light Forces, Heavy Forces,  General Commands, Military Governments and other units, centres and organizations commanded by a general: One Spanish general's baton and sabre.
 Units, centres and organizations commanded by a superior officer or an officer: One Spanish officer's baton and sabre.

Other relevant heraldic external ornaments are the Spanish Royal Crown and the name of the unit centres and organizations and sometimes the motto is also featured.

Navy 
The Spanish Navy uses more emblems than coats of arms used by units, flotillas, Navy Marines, Naval Action Forces, Maritime Action Forces, centres, organisms and Fleet and Navy General Headquarters. The most habitual elements are anchors, cords, ships constructed at different dates and the Spanish royal crown.

Air and Space Force 
There are more emblems than coats of arms used by Spanish Air and Space Force units, air bases, barracks, aerodromes, Air and Space Force General Headquarters, its dependent divisions and other organisms or centres. Air and Space Force emblems first appeared in 1913 displayed on the front part of the fuselage but they were not official until the 1920s. Most squadrons created after the Spanish Civil War didn't have an insignia until 1954, one year after the Pact of Madrid was signed by Spain and the United States. Since then all squadron insignias except the symbol belonged to García Morato Group were replaced. The use of Air Force emblems and badges increased with the introduction of patches on Military uniforms during the decade of the 1970s. An order of the Chief of Staff of the Air and Space Force to regulate the patches was adopted in November 1995. José Ramón Pardo Onrubia and Carlos Bourdón García's book about Spanish Air Force symbols said it would be appropriate to standardize emblems and badges of units centres and organisms.

The Air and Space Force Emblem was granted by Royal Warrant Circular of April 1913. Authorities were looking for quality projects to avoid one old-fashioned design in the future. The chosen proposal, still in use today, was created by Princess and Infanta Beatrice of Saxe-Coburg and Gotha, wife of Spanish Infante and airman Alfonso, Duke of Galliera. Princess Beatrice drew two silver wings united by a red disc with the Spanish royal crown. This is likely Princess Beatrice, Egyptologist and drawer, would have based on the Egyptian scarab, the winged disc of the Burial site of Seti I or Maat's wings. In Spain the Air and Space Force Emblem is known colloquially as Rokiski the last name of the engraver who created military pilot wings between 1939 and 1965. Pilot wings and other Air and Space Force specialties are based on the Rokiski.

Civil Guard 

The Civil Guard (Guardia Civil) units have the most consistent coats of arms collection after the Army. Except the patches, all identification badges of units are also standardized by according to General Order no.  4, 7th May 2015, on use of badges of the Guardia Civil. This regulation reformed the previous General Order no.  35, 14th August 1997, modified by  General Orders 47 of 1997, 31 of 1998, 2 and 8 of 1999,  2 and 13 of 2002, and  11 and 17 of 2003.

These standardized badges are as follows:

Service badges, they comprise the shields linked to each specialty with a heraldic chief Azure with the monogram of the Civil Guard Or. They are the only compulsory to use.
Graduate of Civil Guard courses badges, almost identical to the first but with their chiefs  Gules.
Function and merit badges, some of them are unstandardized. They are not obligatory.
Destiny badges, removed since 2015, represented the zones with the heraldic shields of Spanish regions or autonomous cities and a bordure Argent, general directorates and sub-directorates used a bordure Or.

All coats of arms have been regulated and standardized by the Notice 1/2014, January 28, of the Guardia Civil Assistant Operations Directorate, that updates Annex 2 of the General Order no. 10, of 22nd November 2012, on Guardia Civil Military Honours and complements the General Order no.  4, 7th May 2015. The Notice 1/2014 describes the official design of the coats of arms contained on the guindons of the territorial divisions, units, services and commands of the Guadia Civil.

These coats of arms, with a few exceptions like the Traffic Grouping or the GREIM, have an Iberian escutcheon shape. In all cases are used as supporters the sword and the fasces (the elements of the emblem of the Guardia Civil) but both less inclined to highlight the heraldic shields. All of them also uses the Spanish royal crown as crest, the name of the unit or service depicted below the shield in a banderole and never show the heraldic chiefs with the monogram. There are two notable exceptions although they use standardized coats of arms on their guindons, the College of the Young Guards "Duke of Ahumada", that maintains its traditional heraldry, and the Non-Commissioned Officers and Guards Academy, that displays its motto on a second banderole and applies gothic lettering.

Coats of Arms

Service and Graduate Course Badges

Emblems/Patchs

Former Units

Former Destination Badges (Until 2015)

Royal Guard

Military Emergencies Unit

Other units and organisms

Other badges

See also 
 Armorial of Spain
 Spanish heraldry
 Spanish Armed Forces

References

External links 
 Coat of Arms. Spanish Army .
 Navy Official Emblems. Spanish Navy .
 Emblems. Spanish Air Force .
 Spanish Military Heraldry. Blasones hispanos .
 Fernández Maldonado, Emilio (2011) Spanish Military Heraldry. ASASVE Portal .

Armed Forces
Armed Forces
Spain
Military of Spain
Spanish Army
Spanish Navy
Spanish Air and Space Force